Lepidochrysops trimeni, the Trimen's blue, is a butterfly of the family Lycaenidae. It is found in South Africa, where it is known from the Western Cape.

The wingspan is 37–40 mm for males and 35–42 mm for females. Adults are on wing from September to January or February, with a peak depending on rainfall but usually from October to November. There is one extended generation per year.

The larvae feed on Selago species (including Selago serrata) and Aspalathus sarcantha. Third and later instar larvae feed on the brood of Camponotus maculatus ants.

Etymology
The name honours Roland Trimen.

References

Butterflies described in 1923
Lepidochrysops
Endemic butterflies of South Africa